Thomas the Impostor is a 1965 French drama film directed by Georges Franju and starring Emmanuelle Riva, Fabrice Rouleau, Sophie Dares, Jean Marais and Charles Aznavour. It is based on a novel of the same name by Jean Cocteau.

Plot 
The film is set during World War I, as Paris is expected to fall to the Germans. The Princesse de Bormes, a widow, helps wounded soldiers by evacuating them from the front and bringing them to her villa in Paris for medical care. However, the authorities will not give the Princess and the soldiers passes to return to Paris.  The situation changes when an innocent 16-year-old boy, Guillaume Thomas de Fontenoy, joins the authorities and is mistaken as the nephew of the popular General de Fontenoy.  Thomas is able to use his position of posing as the general's nephew to cut through the red tape, in order to help the Princess.  She is entranced by Thomas, and her daughter, Henriette, falls in love with him.  However, Thomas feels impelled to see more war action. Later, he is caught behind enemy lines when he is moved with a military unit into the heat of battle.

Cast
 Emmanuelle Riva – Princesse de Bormes
 Jean Servais – Pasquel-Duport
 Fabrice Rouleau – Guillaume Thomas de Fontenoy
 Sophie Darès – Henriette
 Michel Vitold – Dr. Vernes
 Charles Aznavour
 Jean-Roger Caussimon – Bishop
 Edouard Dermithe – Captain Roy
 Hélène Dieudonné – Thomas' aunt
 Gabrielle Dorziat – Cartomancienne
 Bernard Lavalette – Dr. Gentil
 Jean Magis – Pagot
 Jean Marais – Narrator (voice)
 André Méliès – Elderly man at the ball
 Jean Ozenne
 Christian Scheyder – Young priest
 Édith Scob – Nurse
 Rosy Varte – Mme. Valiche

Release
Thomas the Impostor was released in France on 5 May 1965.

Reception
In a contemporary review from the Monthly Film Bulletin, noted that film treated war as "fantasy" with Franju's film as being an "almost fairy-tale fantasy of figures moving in a mystical land where everything seems predetermined" and noted that "Emmanuele Riva gives a hauntingly beautiful performance as the Princess, and Fabrice Rouleau looks exactly right as Thomas; and the commentary, finely spoken by Jean Marais, is for once in accord with the images and mood of the film." The review concluded that "Franju has captured the spirit of Cocteau's novel, the point at which the surface glamour of war becomes the awful reality of its suffering."

References

External links 
 
 

1965 films
Films based on works by Jean Cocteau
French black-and-white films
1965 drama films
Films directed by Georges Franju
Films set on the French home front during World War I
Western Front (World War I) films
Films set in Paris
Films with screenplays by Jean Cocteau
1960s French films